Hamilton Township is one of twelve townships in Delaware County, Indiana. According to the 2010 census, its population was 12,169 and it contained 18,785 housing units.

Fire Department
Hamilton Township Volunteer Fire Defartment is currently the only working fire department in the township.  There are 30+ firefighters that work all for the same cause, to preserve life and property in the township. The department currently operates 9 bad-looking trucks, ranging from medical and utility trucks, all the way to specialized pumpers and weird water carrying MTA buses.

History
The Hamilton Township Schoolhouse No. 4 was listed on the National Register of Historic Places in 1904.

Geography

Cities and towns
 Eaton (south edge)
 Muncie (north edge)

Unincorporated towns
 Anthony
 Royerton

Adjacent townships
 Union Township (north)
 Niles Township (northeast)
 Delaware Township (east)
 Liberty Township (southeast)
 Center Township (south)
 Harrison Township (west)
 Washington Township (northwest)

Major highways
  U.S. Route 35
  Indiana State Road 3
  Indiana State Road 28
  Indiana State Road 67

Cemeteries
The township contains four cemeteries: Cullen, Gardens of Memory, Stafford and a cemetery discovered in 2021 by the Delaware County Historical Society's Pioneer Cemetery Preservation Committee about 0.5 miles southwest of Anthony.

Demographics

2020 census
As of the census of 2020,  there were 7,169 people, 2,785 households, and 2,131 families living in the township. The racial makeup of the township was 92.2% White, 2.2% African American, 1.0% Asian, 0.1% Native American or Alaskan Native, 0.01% Native Hawaiian or Pacific Islander, 0.7% from other races, and 3.7% from two or more races. Hispanic or Latino of any race were 2.1% of the population.

There were 2,785 households, of which 19.0% had children under the age of 18 living with them, 57.1% were married couples living together, 25.7% had a female householder with no husband present,  13.1% had a male householder with no wife present, and 4.1% were non-families. 38.8% of all households were made up of individuals. The average household size was 2.57 and the average family size was 2.64.

19.7% of the population had never been married. 58.3% of residents were married and not separated, 8.4% were widowed, 12.7% were divorced, and 0.9% were separated.

The median age in the township was 44.9. 4.8% of residents were under the age of 5; 19.0% of residents were under the age of 18; 81.0% were age 18 or older; and 24.4% were age 65 or older. 6.3% of the population were veterans.

The most common language spoken at home was English with 97.4% speaking it at home, 1.7% spoke Spanish at home, 0.7% spoke an Asian or Pacific Islander language at home, and 0.2% spoke another Indo-European language at home. 3.7% of the population were foreign born.

The median household income in Hamilton Township was $68,925, 22.7% greater than the median average for the state of Indiana. 6.9% of the population were in poverty, including 8.9% of residents under the age of 18.

References
 
 United States Census Bureau cartographic boundary files

External links
 Indiana Township Association
 United Township Association of Indiana

Townships in Delaware County, Indiana
Townships in Indiana